Igor Šarčević (born 25 August 1984) is a Serbian decathlete and bobsledder who has competed since 2008.

Šarcević finished 18th in the four-man event at the 2010 Winter Olympics in Vancouver. At the FIBT World Championships 2009 in Lake Placid, New York, He finished 32nd in the two-man event while crashing out in the four-man event.

Šarcević improved his personal best in decathlon to 7995 points for 9th place at the 2010 European Athletics Championships.

Achievements

Track and field

Bobsleigh

References 
 

1984 births
Living people
Sportspeople from Novi Sad
Bobsledders at the 2010 Winter Olympics
Olympic bobsledders of Serbia
Serbian decathletes
Serbian male bobsledders